East Kingstown (EK) is a Parliamentary Constituency in Saint Vincent and the Grenadines. It is represented by the former Prime Minister Arnhim Eustace and has been represented by Eustace since 1998.

Election
Election 2015

References

Parliamentary constituencies in Saint Vincent and the Grenadines